Monomorium bidentatum is a species of ant in the subfamily Myrmicinae. It is endemic to two South American countries, Chile and Argentina.

Description
The general color is dark brown, with the mandibles, antennae and legs slightly lighter.

Distribution
M. bidentatum is found in Chile and Argentina. It was first described from Valdivia, Chile.

Taxonomy
The genus Antichthonidris contained only two species, A. bidentata and A. denticulata. Both species were originally described by Gustav Mayr under genus Monomorium. However, Antichthonidris was synonymized with Monomorium in 2001, so that this genus is no longer valid, and the two species are again known under their original name.

References

bidentatum
Hymenoptera of South America
Fauna of Chile
Fauna of Argentina
Insects described in 1887
Taxa named by Gustav Mayr
Taxonomy articles created by Polbot
Taxobox binomials not recognized by IUCN